Dishonour Bright is a 1936 British comedy film directed by and starring Tom Walls. It also featured Eugene Pallette, Betty Stockfeld and Diana Churchill and was based on a story by Ben Travers. It was made at Denham Studios. The film's art direction was by Thomas N. Morahan.

Synopsis
Stephen Champion is cited as the co-respondent in a divorce case, but is cheerfully unashamed when he appears in court. During the case he strikes up a flirtatious relationship with Stella Crane, the wife of one of the lawyers. Nonetheless he marries his lover when her divorce comes through. While on his European honeymoon, he comes to Stella's assistance when she is nearly trapped by a cad and his blackmailing associate. Yet it takes some time to convince both his own wife and her husband that his conduct has been entirely honourable.

Cast
 Tom Walls as Stephen Champion
 Eugene Pallette as Busby
 Betty Stockfeld as Stella Crane
 Diana Churchill as Ivy Lamb
 Cecil Parker as Vincent Crane
 Arthur Wontner as Judge
 George Sanders as Lisle
 Henry Oscar as Blenkinsop
 Hubert Harben as Lamb
 Mabel Terry-Lewis as Lady Melbury
 Basil Radford as Henry Crane
 Charlotte Leigh as Miss Tapp
 Michael Morel as Louis
 Dennis Val Norton as Commissionaire
 Jeni Le Gon as Cabaret Dancer

Critical reception
Writing in 1936, Variety described the film as a "bedroom comedy of a quality of which Hollywood would not be ashamed. With stellar values it would have been a pushover. Even in its existing shape it is a highly titillating piece of merchandise, expertly produced and neatly directed, that will tickle the more sophisticated audience on both sides of the Atlantic".

References

Bibliography
 Low, Rachael. Filmmaking in 1930s Britain. George Allen & Unwin, 1985.
 Wood, Linda. British Films, 1927-1939. British Film Institute, 1986.

External links

1936 films
Films directed by Tom Walls
1936 comedy films
British comedy films
Films set in England
Films set in London
Films set in France
Films shot at Denham Film Studios
British black-and-white films
1930s English-language films
1930s British films